The  was a gold currency unit in the shakkanhō system in pre-Meiji Japan. It was eventually replaced with a system based on the yen.

Origins
The ryō was originally a unit of weight from China, the tael. It came into use in Japan during the Kamakura period. By the Azuchi–Momoyama period it had become nearly uniform throughout Japan, about 4.4 monme as a unit of weight (about the same as 16.5 grams).

During the Sengoku period, various local daimyō began to mint their own money. One of the best known and most prestigious of these private coins was the koshukin issued by the warlord Takeda Shingen, who had substantial gold deposits within his territories. The value of the koshukin was based on its weight, with one koshukin equal to one ryō of gold, and thus stamped with its weight (about 15 grams). During the Tenshō period (1573–1592), one ryō was equal to four koku of rice, or 1000 brass coins.

Tokugawa period
The Tokugawa shogunate attempted to create a central currency, based on gold, silver and copper units all exchangeable at fixed rates. Oblong gold coins, called koban, were minted with one koban containing about one ryō of gold, so that koban carried a face value of one ryō. The official rate was set in 1609 at one ryō equal to 50 monme (approx 187 grams) of silver, or 4000 brass coins. However, in reality the relative values between gold, silver and brass currencies fluctuated on an almost daily basis throughout the Edo period.

In 1695 the government decided to increase the amount of metal money in circulation by debasement. As a result, the ryō as a unit of weight of gold and the ryō as the face value of the koban were no longer synonymous. The Keichō koban issued after the monetary reform of May 1601 offered approximately 17.9 grams gold with fineness of 84–87%. The Genroku koban issued in 1695 still weighed around 17.9 grams; however its gold content was reduced to 57%. The Hōei koban of 1706 returned to the original fineness; however, the size was much reduced and it had little more than half the metal value of the Keichō  koban. In 1700 the official exchange rate was adjusted to 1 ryō equal to 60 monme silver (225 grams) or 4000 brass coins. Tokugawa Yoshimune further conducted a reform to stimulate the economy and raise prices in 1736, again lowering the gold content of the koban.

One ryō was also considered equivalent to 1 koku of rice, or the amount of rice needed to feed one person for one year, although this was a less exact standard, which fluctuated depending on the abundance of the rice crop in any particular year.

On June 27, 1871, with the introduction of currency reforms after the Meiji Restoration, the ryō was abolished, and replaced one-for-one with the Yen.

Modern conversion
These fluctuations in the gold content of the koban over time, as well as differences in the cost of living between various points in the Edo period and in modern times make any attempt to relate the value of one ryō in terms of modern currency very difficult. Japanese middle school textbooks often state that one ryō was approximately equivalent to 100,000 Yen at the start of the Edo period, and around 3000–4000 yen at the end of the Edo period. On the other hand, the Currency Museum of the Bank of Japan states that one ryō had a nominal value equivalent 300,000–400,000 yen, but was worth only 120,000–130,000 yen in practice, or 40,000 yen in terms of rice.

See also

 Koban (coin)
 Tael (两, liǎng) in Chinese
 Japanese mon (currency)
 Wadōkaichin

References
 Lucassen, Jan. Wages and Currency: Global Comparisons from Antiquity to the Twentieth Century. Peter Lang (2007), 
 Ohnuki, Mari, "The Genroku, Hoei, Shotoku, Kyoho, and Gembun Koban", Short Essays on Monetary History Contained in Monetary and Economic Studies, Research Division 3, Institute for Monetary and Economic Studies, Bank of Japan (ed.), Monetary and Economic Studies, 15.2 (1997).
 Honjo, Eijiro, "The Economic thought in Tokugawa days", Kyoto University Economic Review, vol. xiii, no. 1 (Kyoto, Oct. 1938), p. 1–22. [Overview of the period 1600 to 1867]

Economy of feudal Japan
Modern obsolete currencies